Colli Maceratesi is a denominazione di origine controllata wine made in the province of Macerata, in the region of Marche, Italy. The DOC was created in 1975, and allows white and red wines.

Geography
The region lies on the eastern coast of Italy, surrounding the town of Macerata.  It also encompasses the towns of Sforzacosta, Pollenza, Corridonia and Tolentino.

The Maceratino Grape
Like many wines of the Marche, Colli Maceratesi uses an obscure local Italian grape in its blend: Maceratino.  This rare grape must comprise at least 80% of the blend. Up to 20% Trebbiano Toscano, Verdicchio, Malvasia Toscana and/or Chardonnay is also allowed.

The red blend must comprise at least %50% Sangiovese, with the remaining 50% allotted to any combination of Cabernet Franc, Cabernet Sauvignon, Ciliegiolo, Lacrima, Merlot and/or Montepulciano.

The red wine of this appellation is called Colli Maceratesi Rosso and must comprise at least 50% of the Sangiovese grape with the remaining 50% from Cabernet Franc, Cabernet Sauvignon, Ciliegiolo, Lacrima Merlot and Montepulciano.

References

Italian DOC
Province of Macerata
Wines of Marche